Taeniaptera feei, the palm grove stilt-legged fly, is a species of stilt-legged fly in the family Micropezidae.

References

Micropezidae
Articles created by Qbugbot
Insects described in 1986